Colonel James Morris Colquhoun Colvin VC (26 August 1870 – 7 December 1945) was an English recipient of the Victoria Cross, the highest and most prestigious award for gallantry in the face of the enemy that can be awarded to a member of a British or Commonwealth force.

Early life
Colvin was born in Bijnor, United Provinces, British India to James Colquhoun Colvin of the Manor House, Sutton Veny, Wiltshire, and Camilla Fanny Marie Morris, who was the eldest daughter of the Rev. Edward Morris. Colvin's father serviced with the Bengal Civil Service. He was awarded the India Mutiny medal for defending the House of Arrah. The Colvin family had been involved for a long time in various capacities in the British East Indies, serving as soldiers and administrators. Colvin's extended family members included Sir John Russell Colvin, Lieutenant-Governor of the North-West Provinces during the Indian Mutiny, and his sons Sir Auckland, K.C.S.I. and Sir Elliot Graham, K.C.S.I. Their most notable cousin was the English writer and curator Sir Sidney Colvin, known for his friendship with the young Robert Louis Stevenson.

Military service
He was educated at Charterhouse and the Royal Military Academy, Woolwich. There, for distinguished proficiency, he was awarded the Pollock Gold Medal and Memoir as a Cadet Senior Under Officer. He was also awarded the Regulation Sword for exemplary conduct. A travelling clock, aneroid barometer, thermometer and compass were awarded to him for maths and mechanics. H.R.H. the Duke of Cambridge presented the awards after inspecting cadets at RMA Woolwich, on 26 July 1889.

On 27 July 1889, Colvin joined the Royal Engineers as a second lieutenant. Three years later, he was promoted to lieutenant on 27 July 1892. He served in the Chitral Relief Force in 1895 with the 4th Company, Bengal Sappers and Miners. He served on the North West Frontier of India with the Malakand Field Force in 1897–1898, and took part in operations in Bajaur, and in the Mohmand country and in Buner. He was mentioned in dispatches.

Mohmand Campaign
Colvin was 27 years old, and a lieutenant in the British Army Corps of Royal Engineers during the Mohmand campaign of 1897–98 in India when his actions resulted in him subsequently being awarded the Victoria Cross.
Colvin was in the Mohmand Valley, North West British India, with Lieutenant Thomas Colclough Watson on the night of 16/17 September 1897. Watson collected a party of volunteers and led them into the village of Bilot. They attempted to dislodge the enemy who were inflicting losses on the British. Although Watson had been incapacitated by his wounds, undeterred, Lieutenant Colvin made two additional attempts to clear enemy fighters from the village. "He was conspicuous during the whole night for his devotion to his men, in the most exposed positions and under very heavy fire.".

The award of the Victoria Cross was published in the London Gazette on 20 May 1898. The citation read;

Queen Victoria invested Colvin with the Victoria Cross on 19th July 1898 at Windsor Castle.

Two others who served with Colvin were also awarded a Victoria Cross—Lieutenant Thomas Colclough Watson and Corporal James Smith, The Buffs ( East Kent Regiment ).

Colvin served with the Malakand Field Force, 1897–98, where he took part in operations in Bajaur, the Mohmand Country and in Bruner (mentioned-in-Despatches L.G. 11 January 1898).

Second Boer War
Colvin was promoted to captain on 1 April 1900, and served in South Africa in 1901–02 during the Second Boer War as Special Service Officer. In May 1901 he was appointed an Aide-de-camp to Lieutenant-General Sir Bindon Blood, who was stationed in eastern Transvaal. He remained in South Africa until the war ended in May 1902, and left for Calcutta on the SS Umlazi two months later. For his service in the war, he was again mentioned in despatches (L.G. 22 August 1902), received the brevet promotion to major and awarded the Queen’s Medal with three clasps on 22 August 1902, and his name was noted as qualified for Staff employment.

Later service

 Appointed Staff Captain, Army Headquarters, Simla, India on 11 April 1903 to 15 March 1906
 Passed Staff College, Camberley, in 1909
 General Staff Officer 2nd Grade, Quetta Division on 7 May 1911 to 2 November 1915
 Promoted Lieutenant-Colonel on 18 January 1917
 Mentioned-in-Despatches (the Despatch, dated 20 August 1918, of Sir C.C. Munro) vide p. 13907 of London Gazette No. 31031, dated 26 November 1918.
 Appointed Commandant, 3rd Sappers and Miners, Kirkey, India

Orders and medals
 Victoria Cross
 India General Service Medal 1895-1902 with clasps 'Relief of Chitral 1895', 'Punjab Frontier 1897–98'
 Queen's South Africa Medal(1899–1902) with clasps 'Transvaal', 'South Africa 1901', and 'South Africa 1902'
 British War Medal (1914–20)
 King George VI Coronation Medal (1937)

Family
Colvin married Katharine Way, youngest daughter of Colonel George Augustus Way, CB on 23 January 1904 in Simla India. They had three children:
 Katharine Camilla Colvin, who married Noel Beresford-Peirse
 James Bazett Colvin
 John Alexander Colvin, born 9 July 1913

Death details
James Colvin died at Stanway, near Colchester on 7 December 1945, aged 75. He was cremated at Ipswich Crematorium on 11 December, and his ashes scattered in the Old Garden of Rest.

Notes

References

See also

 Monuments to Courage (David Harvey, 1999)

 The Register of the Victoria Cross (This England, 1997)
 The Sapper VCs (Gerald Napier, 1998)
 Paul Woodness
 The Victoria Cross 1856–1920 (Hayward)
 The History of the Victoria Cross (Philip A. Wilkins)

External links
 Royal Engineers Museum Sappers VCs
 Location of grave and VC medal (Suffolk)

People educated at Charterhouse School
1870 births
1945 deaths
Military personnel of British India
British recipients of the Victoria Cross
Royal Engineers officers
Bengal Sappers and Miners personnel
Graduates of the Royal Military Academy, Woolwich
British military personnel of the Chitral Expedition
British Army personnel of the Second Boer War
British military personnel of the Malakand Frontier War
British Army personnel of World War I
British military personnel of the First Mohmand Campaign
Graduates of the Staff College, Camberley
British Army recipients of the Victoria Cross